

In graph

2023

Colombia's 15 busiest airports by passenger traffic (JAN-JAN)

2022

Colombia's 15 busiest airports by passenger traffic

2021

Colombia's 15 busiest airports by passenger traffic

2020

Colombia's 15 busiest airports by passenger traffic

2019

Colombia's 15 busiest airports by passenger traffic

2018

Colombia's 15 busiest airports by passenger traffic

2017

Colombia's 15 busiest airports by passenger traffic

2016

Colombia's 15 busiest airports by passenger traffic

2015

Colombia's 15 busiest airports by passenger traffic

2014

Colombia's 15 busiest airports by passenger traffic

2013

Colombia's 15 busiest airports by passenger traffic

2012

Colombia's 15 busiest airports by passenger traffic

2011

Colombia's 15 busiest airports by passenger traffic

2010

Colombia's 15 busiest airports by passenger traffic

References

 
Co